Essex Township, Illinois may refer to:

 Essex Township, Kankakee County, Illinois
 Essex Township, Stark County, Illinois

See also 
 Essex Township (disambiguation)

Illinois township disambiguation pages